Immunodysregulation polyendocrinopathy enteropathy X-linked (or IPEX) syndrome is a rare disease linked to the dysfunction of the gene encoding transcription factor forkhead box P3 (FOXP3), widely considered to be the master regulator of the regulatory T cell lineage. It leads to the dysfunction of CD4+ regulatory T-cells and the subsequent autoimmunity. The disorder is one of the autoimmune polyendocrine syndromes and manifests with autoimmune enteropathy, psoriasiform or eczematous dermatitis, nail dystrophy, autoimmune endocrinopathies, and autoimmune skin conditions such as alopecia universalis and bullous pemphigoid.
Management for IPEX has seen limited success in treating the syndrome by bone marrow transplantation.

Presentation
The most representative criterion for diagnose of IPEX syndrome is autoimmune enteropathy. First symptoms of enteropathy begin in first day of life and they are characterized by diarrhea, vomiting, gastritis, ileus and colitis. The second hallmark is type 1 diabetes (T1D) and the worst complication of it is destruction of pancreas confirmed by histological examinations. Dermatitis is next sign and it can be presented in three forms: eczematiform (mainly atopic dermatitis), ichthyosiform and psoriasiform or combinations of them. Other skin manifestations can include cheilitis, onychodystrophy and alopecia. Beside the three most significant triada of symptoms during this syndrome other not so typical symptoms include: thyroid and renal dysfunction, reduced counts of thrombocytes and neutrophils, arthritis, splenomegaly, lymphadenopathy and infections.

Family history of IPEX patients
IPEX patients are usually born with normal weight and length at term. Nevertheless, the first symptoms may present in the first days of life, and some reported cases labeled newborns with intrauterine growth retardation and evidence of meconium in the amniotic fluid.

Triad of symptoms 

A serious course of the disease is marked by a triad of symptoms: intractable diarrhea, T1D, and eczema.

Clinical manifestations include: enteropathy, skin manifestations, endocrinopathy, hematologic abnormalities, infections, autoimmune hemolytic anemia and food allergy.

Genetics

IPEX syndrome is inherited in males via an x-linked recessive manner, as the FOXP3 gene, whose cytogenetic location is Xp11.23, is involved in this condition's mechanism. The FOXP3 gene has 12 exons and its full reading open frame encodes 431 amino-acids. FOXP3 is a member of the FKH family of transcription factors and contains a proline‐rich (PRR) amino‐terminal domain, central zinc finger (ZF) and leucine zipper (LZ) domains important for protein–protein interactions, and a carboxyl‐terminal FKH domain required for nuclear localization and DNA‐binding activity. In humans, exons 2 and 7 are spliced and excluded from the protein. A large variety of mutations have been found, including single base substitutions, deletions, and splicing mutations. A consequence of malfunctioning FOXP3 expression leads to a defect in Treg production. Those patients do not have circulating CD4+/CD25+/FOXP3+ Treg cells. Reduced expression of FOXP3 has been described, and these patients may express normal levels of dysfunctional protein, which leads to mild symptoms later in life or during the neonatal period. In case of suspicion of IPEX syndrome patients should have genetic testing, even if FOXP31 T cells are present in the periphery. Mutation of FOXP3 leading to expression of malfunctioning protein is often localized in the DNA-binding domain called the forkhead domain. The truncated protein cannot bind to its DNA binding site
and thus its function concerning T regulatory lymphocytes development and functioning is impaired. The absence or dysfunction of regulatory T cells is the cause of autoimmune symptoms.

Data from 2018 describes over 70 mutations in FOXP3 gene leading to IPEX syndrome. Nonetheless, this number is still changing with new cases and discoveries coming. For example, in 2010 there were only 20 mutations of FOXP3 known in the literature.

FOXP3 pathways
FOXP3 can function as both a repressor and a trans‐activator of Treg cells depending on its interactions with other proteins. FOXP3 expression is characterised by controlling transcription, influencing epigenetic changes and post-transcriptional modifications. The N‐terminal repressor domain of FOXP3 can change transcription or epigenetic regulation of Treg cells. Transcriptional activity is altered through interactions between the N-terminal domain and Eos - which associates with CtBP1 and forms a corepressor complex. This complex binds the IL2 promoter and enables FOXP3 to repress IL2 transcription in Treg cells. FOXP3 forms complexes with histone deacetylase (HDAC)7, HDAC9, and the histone acetyl transferase TIP60, which alters epigenetic activity of Treg cells. The N‐terminal domain of FOXP3 can also antagonize the transcription factors RORγ and RORα, thereby inhibiting TH17 cell differentiation. FOXP3 is linked to TCR signaling by downstream transcription factors. All of these findings verify the importance of FOXP3 in the regulation of transcriptional activity/repression in Treg cells.

Mechanism
This autoimmunity called IPEX is an attack from the body's own immune system against the body's own tissues and organs. Early age onset of this disease in males causes severe enlargement of the secondary lymphoid organs, and insulin dependent diabetes

This condition indicates the loss of CD4+ CD25+ T regulatory cells, and express the transcription factor Foxp3. Foxp3 decrease is a consequence of unchecked T cell activation, which is secondary to loss of regulatory T cells. Causes of death include haemorrhage, sepsis, Intractable diarrhoea and diabetic complications

Diagnosis
Early detection of the disease is crucial because mortality is on high level without treatment. The diagnosis of immunodysregulation polyendocrinopathy enteropathy X-linked syndrome is consistent with the following criteria:
 Clinical triad
 Family history
 Laboratory findings: elevated serum concentration of IgE, eosinophilia, autoimmune anemia and decreased number of FOXP3 Treg cells.
 Genetic testing: single-gene testing and multigene panel.

Treatment

In terms of treatment the following are done to manage the IPEX syndrome in those affected individuals (corticosteroids are the first treatment that is used):
 TPN (nutritional purpose)
 Cyclosporin A and Tacrolimus
 Sirolimus (should Tacrolimus prove non-effective)
 Granulocyte colony stimulating factor
 Bone marrow transplant
 Rituximab

Research
In non-human research that has been conducted there is as well a special mouse model simulating the development and progression of the IPEX syndrome. The model mice are called "scurfy mice" and they have had 2 base pairs inserted within the Foxp3 gene. This leads to a frameshift mutation in Foxp3 gene and the expressed protein is truncated, causing functional deficiency of Treg cells. Consequently, autoreactive CD4+T cells and inflammatory cells are causing tissue damaging. Beside CD4+T cells to inflammation disorder contribute B cells by producing autoantibodies like antinuclear antibodies. The mice had enlarged spleen and lymph nodes, redness in eyes, and skin abnormalities. The mice also had immunity problems and died after approximately 3 weeks.

See also 
 Autoimmune polyendocrine syndrome
 FOXP3
 Autoimmune polyendocrine syndrome type 2

References

Further reading

External links 
 PubMed

Autoimmune diseases
Transcription factor deficiencies
Diseases of immune dysregulation
Syndromes affecting immunity
Rare genetic syndromes